The 2018 AFC U-23 Championship (also known as the 2018 AFC U-23 Asian Cup) was the third edition of the AFC U-23 Championship, the biennial international age-restricted football championship organised by the Asian Football Confederation (AFC) for the men's under-23 national teams of Asia. A total of 16 teams competed in the tournament. It took place between 9–27 January 2018, and was hosted by China.

Uzbekistan defeated Vietnam in the final to win their first title. Japan were the defending champions, but failed to defend the title after losing to Uzbekistan in the quarter-finals.

Hosts selection

Qualification

The qualifiers were held from 15 to 23 July 2017. China also participated in the qualifiers, even though they had already qualified automatically as hosts.

Qualified teams
The following 16 teams qualified for the final tournament.

Venues
The competition was played in four venues in four cities, all in the province of Jiangsu.

Draw
The draw of the final tournament was held on 24 October 2017, 16:00 CST (UTC+8), at the Traders Fudu Hotel in Changzhou. The 16 teams were drawn into four groups of four teams. The teams were seeded according to their performance in the 2016 AFC U-23 Championship final tournament and qualification, with the hosts China automatically seeded and assigned to Position A1 in the draw.

Match officials
The following referees were chosen for the 2018 AFC U-23 Championship. Additional assistant referees were used in this tournament.

Referees

  Chris Beath
  Peter Green
  Nawaf Shukralla
  Fu Ming
  Ma Ning
  Liu Kwok Man
  Alireza Faghani
  Ali Sabah
  Mohanad Qasim Eesee Sarray
  Ryuji Sato
  Jumpei Iida
  Adham Makhadmeh
  Kim Dong-jin
  Ko Hyung-jin
  Ahmed Al-Kaf
  Abdulrahman Al-Jassim
  Khamis Al-Marri
  Fahad Al-Mirdasi
  Turki Al-Khudhayr
  Muhammad Taqi
  Hettikamkanamge Perera
  Mohammed Abdulla Hassan Mohamed
  Ravshan Irmatov
  Valentin Kovalenko

Assistant referees

  Matthew Cream
  Ebrahim Saleh
  Yaser Tulefat
  Cao Yi
  Huo Weiming
  Mohammadreza Mansouri
  Reza Sokhandan
  Yagi Akane
  Toru Sagara
  Ahmad Al-Roalle
  Yoon Kwang-yeol
  Sergei Grishchenko
  Mohd Yusri Mohamad
  Abu Bakar Al-Amri
  Saud Al-Maqaleh
  Taleb Al-Marri
  Mohammed Al-Abakry
  Abdullah Al-Shalawi
  Ronnie Koh Min Kiat
  Palitha Hemathunga
  Mohamed Al-Hammadi
  Hasan Al-Mahri
  Abdukhamidullo Rasulov
  Jakhongir Saidov

Support referees
  Minoru Tōjō
  Ilgiz Tantashev
Support assistant referees
  Ahmad Ali
  Nguyễn Trung Hậu

Squads

Players born on or after 1 January 1995 are eligible to compete in the tournament. Each team must register a squad of minimum 18 players and maximum 23 players, minimum three of whom must be goalkeepers (Regulations Articles 24.1 and 24.2).

Group stage
The top two teams of each group advance to the quarter-finals.
Tiebreakers

Teams are ranked according to points (3 points for a win, 1 point for a draw, 0 points for a loss), and if tied on points, the following tiebreaking criteria are applied, in the order given, to determine the rankings (Regulations Article 9.3):
Points in head-to-head matches among tied teams;
Goal difference in head-to-head matches among tied teams;
Goals scored in head-to-head matches among tied teams;
If more than two teams are tied, and after applying all head-to-head criteria above, a subset of teams are still tied, all head-to-head criteria above are reapplied exclusively to this subset of teams;
Goal difference in all group matches;
Goals scored in all group matches;
Penalty shoot-out if only two teams are tied and they met in the last round of the group;
Disciplinary points (yellow card = 1 point, red card as a result of two yellow cards = 3 points, direct red card = 3 points, yellow card followed by direct red card = 4 points);
Drawing of lots.

All times are local, CST (UTC+8).

Group A

Group B

Group C

Group D

Knockout stage
In the knockout stage, extra time and penalty shoot-out are used to decide the winner if necessary (Regulations Articles 12.1 and 12.2).

Bracket

Quarter-finals

Semi-finals

Third place match

Final
This was the first time ever that Vietnam and Uzbekistan met together in final. For Vietnam, this was their first appearance in an AFC final at any level.

Winners

Awards
The following awards were given at the conclusion of the tournament:

Statistics

Goalscorers

Tournament team rankings

Broadcasting rights
: beIN Sports (MENA), Alkaas Sports Channels
: Fox Sports Australia
: CCTV, PPTV, Guangdong Sports
: Fox Sports Asia
: JTBC3 Fox Sports
: VTV (shared by Fox Sports Asia)

References

External links
, the-AFC.com
AFC U-23 Championship 2018, stats.the-AFC.com

 
2018
U-23 Championship
2018 in youth association football
2018 in Chinese football
2018 AFC U-23 Championship
January 2018 sports events in China